Korravee Pimsuk (nicknamed Kaew, born 4 April 1992) is a Thai actress and fashion model who also works in Myanmar. She is best known for her breakthrough role as Emily in the 2018 film Deception, which propelled her to fame in Myanmar.

Early life and education
Korravee was born on 4 April 1992 in Bangkok, Thailand. She is the youngest daughter of four siblings. She graduated with broadcasting from Bangkok University.

Career
Korravee started modeling at her age of 21 and also acted magazine cover photos. She made her acting debut with a leading role in the Thai-Burmese film Myanmar In Love In Bangkok (Ruk Pasa A-Rai) which screened in Thailand and Myanmar cinemas in 2014. The film about the love between a Thai woman and a male migrant worker from Myanmar. The film is led to increased recognition for Korravee.

In 2015, Korravee starred in her second film 67 Plaza alongside Burmese singer and actor Hlwan Paing, the film released in June 2018.

In 2017, she portrayed her role as Emily in the 2018 film Deception: Oo Pal Dan Myin, alongside Zenn Kyi and Thet Mon Myint, which premiered in Myanmar cinemas on 19 January 2018 stayed in local theaters for a record seven weeks and was also screened in Singapore. The film which was a huge commercial hit slot nationally, topping film ratings and becoming the most watched film at that time. Korravee's portrayal of the character earned praised by fans for her acting performance and character interpretation, and experienced a resurgence of popularity.

Filmography

Film

References

External links 

1992 births
Living people
Burmese film actresses
21st-century Burmese actresses
Kaew Korravee
Kaew Korravee
Kaew Korravee